Jim Howe (7 November 1895 – 28 December 1958) was a former Australian rules footballer who played with Carlton in the Victorian Football League (VFL).

Notes

External links 		

	
Jim Howe's profile at Blueseum		
		
		
		
		
1895 births
Australian rules footballers from Victoria (Australia)		
Carlton Football Club players
1958 deaths